David Paul Steiner (born May 4, 1960 in Oakland, California) is an American lawyer and corporate executive. He served as a member of the board of directors of Vulcan Materials from 2017 to 2019. Steiner was Chief Executive Officer at Waste Management Inc., Director (from 2004-2010) and President (from 2010-2016). He is also a Director at TE Connectivity Ltd., Greater Houston Partnership, Tyco Electronics Corporation and FedEx Corporation, the latter of which he also holds the role of Lead Independent Director.

Career

Vulcan Materials Company elected David P. Steiner to its board of directors, effective immediately. Steiner will serve on Vulcan's safety, health and environmental affairs committee and the governance committee. Steiner stepped down as CEO of Waste Management in November 2016. Steiner also currently serves on the board of directors of FedEx Corp.

Prior to his current role at Waste Management Inc., Steiner was Chief Financial Officer, Executive Vice President, Senior Vice President, Deputy General Counsel, General Counsel and Corporate Secretary of the firm. He has been with the firm since 2000.

He has been a partner at Phelps Dunbar LLP, and an attorney at Gibson, Dunn & Crutcher.

Education
Steiner has a BS in Accounting from Louisiana State University where he was a member of the Phi Delta Theta fraternity and a JD from the University of California, Los Angeles.

Personal data
He is married to Judy and the couple has three children:  Paul, Matthew, and Miguel.

References

American chief executives
Louisiana State University alumni
UCLA School of Law alumni
1960 births
Living people
People associated with Gibson Dunn